A beer snake, or cup snake, is the stacking of numerous plastic beer cups to form a "snake."  Beer snakes are most commonly found at sporting events that are played out over many hours, such as cricket. Some snakes have been reported in the media as being up to 175 m long. They are typically formed during breaks in play or when the outcome of the match is all but certain; for example, when the fourth Test of the Pakistani cricket team in England in 2006 tour at The Oval was halted after ball-tampering allegations, a large beer snake was constructed in the OCS stand.

Materials

A beer snake is made with a large number of empty plastic beer cups, usually those issued by the bars on site at the stadium.  Many sports stadiums do not allow glass containers for safety reasons, and use plastic cups for serving beer. These plastic cups, once empty, provide the flexible building blocks for constructing the beer snake when inserted into each other.

Origins
An early version of beer snake was recorded on June 24, 1969, at Wrigley Field, Chicago, Illinois, as documented in the Chicago Sun-Times edition published the next day. This predates, by nearly three decades, the genuinely documented early beer snake in January 1997 at the WACA Ground in Perth, Australia. A newspaper article in the Sydney Morning Herald cited Michael Gray as "The Snake Charmer" and architect of the social phenomenon.

Procedure

As such a large number of cups are needed, gathering normally occurs in large groups of people. The cups are simply stacked within each other until they form a tube or 'snake'. Once the snake has reached a substantial length, it is held skyward to 'dance' as if being charmed. Snake length is often restricted by the width of the bay of seats, as anything longer will protrude into the aisle. One solution to this is to team up with other groups and link your snakes together. The biggest challenge is to keep the snake in one continuous piece, without it collapsing (as shown in image).

Security staff at many sporting venues normally deter such behaviour, and they will often attempt to confiscate the empty cups from people attempting to build a beer snake. This is in part due to the potential dangers of such structures in crowded places, and also because the component cups are often not completely empty and will therefore spill beer on to spectators.

As a result of several minor injuries that occurred when a beer snake collapsed during a regular-season Canadian Football League game, the Winnipeg Football Club banned the creation of beer snakes during their football games.

Notable examples

 January 20, 2013: It is believed that the longest-ever beer snake was created during a two-hour rain delay at an Australia versus Sri Lanka one-day cricket match in Sydney, Australia. The snake was reported to have spanned the width of the SCG's Victor Trumper Stand. Christopher Douglas, who was in attendance, reports that it was between 100 and 175 metres long, beating the previous record held at the WACA Ground, Perth, Australia in 2007.
 March 8, 2020: During an XFL game between the DC Defenders and St. Louis BattleHawks at Audi Field, fans formed a beer snake with approximately 1,237 cups. XFL commissioner Oliver Luck also contributed to the snake with his own cup. Defenders fans had created an earlier beer snake, which was 75 feet long, during a February 15 game against the New York Guardians.
 June 4, 2021: Toronto Blue Jays fans at Sahlen Field in Buffalo, New York, constructed a 291-cup beer snake during a 13–1 blowout loss to the Houston Astros.
 June 13, 2021: Chicago Cubs fans formed an "insanely long" beer snake in celebration over beating their archrival, the St. Louis Cardinals.
 July 1, 2021: St. Paul Saints fans and 10,000 Takes joined forces and broke the record for largest cup snake in North America, with a 102-foot cup snake.
 July 3, 2021: Oakland Athletics fans create a massive beer snake during a game against the Boston Red Sox.
 November 30, 2021: Minnesota Wild fans and 10,000 Takes partner to bring the NHL its first Cup Snake and break the verified World Record for largest cup snake, at 247 feet.
 March 18, 2021: Colorado Mammoth fans, along with Ball, break the record for longest cup snake, at 311 feet. The use of Ball Aluminum Cups also makes this cup snake the most sustainable.
 February 19, 2023: DC Defenders fans at Audi Field created a beer snake which was taken away by security, leading to beer snake chants and the throwing of lemons onto the field. After the Defenders negotiated with Audi Field security and set new guidelines, the beer snake was permitted during the March 5 game against the Battlehawks.

See also

Beer wench

References

External links
 News article mentioning beer snake

Drinking culture
Cricket culture
Beer in Australia
Beer culture
Sports culture in Australia